Paradis may refer to:

Places

Belgium
Paradis (Charleroi Metro), a Belgian railway station located in Fontaine-l'Évêque

Canada
 Paradis, Quebec, Canada
 Paradise Lake (Quebec) or Lac Paradis, Canada

Iran
 Paradis, Iran, a village

Norway
 Paradis, Bergen, a neighborhood in the city of Bergen in Vestland county
 Paradis (station), a Bergen Light Rail station - see List of Bergen Light Rail stations
 Paradis (Kristiansand), a neighborhood in the city of Kristiansand in Agder county
 Paradis, Rogaland, a neighborhood in the city of Stavanger in Rogaland county
 Paradis Station, a railway station in Paradis, Rogaland

Saint Martin
 Pic Paradis, the highest point on the Caribbean island of Saint Martin, an overseas collectivity of France

United States
 Paradis, Louisiana, United States, a census-designated place

Other uses
 Paradis (duo), French electronic music duo
 Paradis (surname), a list of people whose surname is Paradis
 Paradis (novel), a 1981 novel by Philippe Sollers
 Tour Paradis (Paradise Tower), a skyscraper in Liege, Belgium
 Paradis, the French name for the gods, the highest viewing area in a theatre
 Paradis Island, the setting of Attack on Titan in which the world's geography matches our own. Paradis Island is present-day Madagascar
 "Paradis", a 2017 song by Orelsan from La fête est finie

See also

 Paradise (disambiguation)
 Paradiso (disambiguation)